In molecular biology, glycoside hydrolase family 48 is a family of glycoside hydrolases.

Glycoside hydrolases  are a widespread group of enzymes that hydrolyse the glycosidic bond between two or more carbohydrates, or between a carbohydrate and a non-carbohydrate moiety. A classification system for glycoside hydrolases, based on sequence similarity, has led to the definition of >100 different families. This classification is available on the CAZy web site, and also discussed at CAZypedia, an online encyclopedia of carbohydrate active enzymes.

Glycoside hydrolase family 48 CAZY GH_48 comprises enzymes with several known activities; endoglucanase; cellobiohydrolase.

An example of an enzyme containing a domain belonging to this family is one of the cellulases (celA) from the genome of the thermophilic anaerobic bacterium Caldocellum saccharolyticum. The celA gene product is a polypeptide of 1751 amino acids; this has a multidomain structure comprising two catalytic domains and two cellulose-binding domains, linked by Pro-Thr-rich regions. The N-terminal domain encodes an endoglucanase activity on carboxymethylcellulose, consistent with its similarity to several endo-1, 4-beta-D-glucanase sequences, and is a member of the glycoside hydrolase family 9. The C-terminal domain belongs to this family shows similarity to a cellulase from Clostridium thermocellum (CelS), which acts synergistically with a second component to hydrolyse crystalline cellulose.

References 

EC 3.2.1
GH family
Protein families